The Pacific West Conference men's basketball tournament is the annual conference basketball championship tournament for the Pacific West Conference (PacWest). The tournament has been held annually since 2013. It is a single-elimination tournament and seeding is based on regular season records.

The winner receives the PacWest's automatic bid to the NCAA Men's Division II Basketball Championship.

Results

Championship records

 Fresno Pacific and Hawaii–Hilo have not yet qualified for the PacWest tournament finals. 
Grand Canyon, Holy Names, and Notre Dame de Namur never qualified for the tournament finals before departing the PacWest.
 Schools highlighted in pink are former PacWest members.

See also
 Pacific West Conference women's basketball tournament

References

NCAA Division II men's basketball conference tournaments
Tournament
Recurring sporting events established in 2013